Richard Bartlett (1922–1994) was an American director and producer.

Richard Bartlett may also refer to:

Ricky Bartlett (born 1966), English cricketer
Richard J. Bartlett (1926–2015), American jurist

See also
Richard Bartlot (1471–1557), English physician